Smoke Bellew is a 1929 American silent Western film directed by Scott R. Dunlap and starring Conway Tearle, Barbara Bedford and Alphonse Ethier. It is based on the 1912 short story collection Smoke Bellew.

Cast
 Conway Tearle as Kit 'Smoke' Bellew
 Barbara Bedford as Joy Gastell
 Mark Hamilton as Jack Short 
 Alphonse Ethier as Harry Sprague
 William Scott as Stine
 Alaska Jack as Prospector
 J.P. Lockney as Caribou Charlie Gastell

References

Bibliography
 Langman, Larry. A Guide to Silent Westerns. Greenwood Publishing Group, 1992.

External links
 

1929 films
1929 adventure films
1929 Western (genre) films
American adventure films
American black-and-white films
Films directed by Scott R. Dunlap
Silent American Western (genre) films
Films based on works by Jack London
Films based on short fiction
1920s English-language films
1920s American films
Silent adventure films